Belt Creek may refer to:

Belt Creek (Ontario) in Ontario, Canada.
Belt Creek (Montana), a tributary of the Missouri River in Montana in the United States.